The Sino-Dutch conflicts  were a series of conflicts between the Ming dynasty (and later its rump successor the Southern Ming dynasty and the Ming loyalist Kingdom of Tungning) of China and the Dutch East India Company over trade and land throughout the 1620s, 1630s, and 1662. The Dutch were attempting to compel China to accede to their trade demands, but the Chinese defeated the Dutch forces.

Sino-Dutch conflicts

1620s
The Dutch East India Company used their military power in the attempt to force China to open up a port in Fujian to their trade. They demanded that China expel the Portuguese from Macau. (The Dutch were fighting in the Dutch–Portuguese War at the time.) The Dutch raided Chinese shipping after 1618 and took junks hostage to coerce China into meeting their demands. All these actions were unsuccessful.

The Dutch were defeated by the Portuguese at the Battle of Macau in 1622. That same year, the Dutch seized Penghu (the Pescadores Islands), built a fort there, and continued to demand that China open up ports in Fujian to Dutch trade. China refused, with the Chinese governor of Fujian (Fukien) Shang Zhouzuo (Shang Chou-tso) demanding that the Dutch withdraw from the Pescadores to Formosa (Taiwan), where the Chinese would permit them to engage in trade. This led to a war between the Dutch and China between 1622 and 1624 which ended with the Chinese being successful in making the Dutch withdraw to Taiwan and abandoning the Pescadores.

The Dutch threatened that China would face Dutch raids on Chinese ports and shipping unless the Chinese allowed trading on Penghu and that China not trade with Manila but only with the Dutch in Batavia and Siam and Cambodia. However, the Dutch found out that unlike smaller Southeast Asian kingdoms, China could not be bullied or intimidated by them. After Shang ordered them to withdraw to Taiwan on September 19 of 1622, the Dutch raided Amoy on October and November. The Dutch intended to "induce the Chinese to trade by force or from fear" by raiding Fujian and Chinese shipping from the Pescadores. Long artillery batteries were erected at Amoy in March 1622 by Colonel Li Gonghua as a defence against the Dutch.

On the Dutch attempt in 1623 to force China to open up a port, five Dutch ships were sent to Liu-ao and the mission ended in failure for the Dutch, with a number of Dutch sailors taken prisoner and one of their ships lost. In response to the Dutch using captured Chinese for forced labor and strengthening their garrison in Penghu with five more ships in addition to the six already there, the new governor of Fujian Nan Juyi (Nan Chü-yi) was permitted by China to begin preparations to attack the Dutch forces in July 1623. A Dutch raid was defeated by the Chinese at Amoy in October 1623, with the Chinese taking the Dutch commander Christian Francs prisoner and burning one of the four Dutch ships. Yu Zigao began an offensive in February 1624 with warships and troops against the Dutch in Penghu with the intent of expelling them.

The Chinese offensive reached the Dutch fort on July 30, 1624, with 5,000 Chinese troops (or 10,000) and 40-50 warships under Yu and General Wang Mengxiong surrounding the fort commanded by Marten Sonck, and the Dutch were forced to sue for peace on August 3, withdrawing from Penghu to Taiwan. The Dutch admitted that their attempt at military force to coerce China into trading with them had failed with their defeat in Penghu. At the Chinese victory celebrations over the "red-haired barbarians" as the Dutch were called by the Chinese, Nan Juyi paraded twelve Dutch soldiers who were captured before the Emperor in Beijing. The Dutch were astonished that their violence did not intimidate the Chinese and at the subsequent Chinese attack on their fort in Penghu since they had thought them timid and from their experience in Southeast Asia had regarded them as a "faint-hearted troupe".

1630s

After the Dutch defeat and expulsion from the Pescadores in the 1622–1624, they were totally driven off China's coast. The pirates Liu Xiang and Li Guozhu also joined the Dutch, and for a time it seemed the Dutch would triumph as the head of a new pirate coalition that operated off the coast of China, with at least 41 pirate junks and 450 Chinese soldiers. However they were decisively defeated by Chinese forces under Admiral Zheng Zhilong at the Battle of Liaoluo Bay in 1633. The Chinese used fireships disguised as warships to fool the Dutch into thinking they were going into pitched battle.

1660s and 1670s

In 1662 the Dutch were defeated and driven off Taiwan at the Siege of Fort Zeelandia by Chinese forces under Zheng Chenggong (Koxinga). The Dutch looted relics and killed monks after attacking a Buddhist complex at Putuoshan on the Zhoushan islands in 1665 during their war against Zheng Chenggong's son Zheng Jing.

Zheng Jing's navy executed thirty four Dutch sailors and drowned eight Dutch sailors after looting, ambushing and sinking the Dutch fluyt ship Cuylenburg in 1672 on northeastern Taiwan. Only twenty one Dutch sailors escaped to Japan. The ship was going from Nagasaki to Batavia on a trade mission.

See also
 Cambodian–Dutch War
 Trịnh–Nguyễn War

References

Citations

Bibliography
 
 
 
 
 
 
 
 
 
 
 
 
 
 
 

17th-century conflicts
17th century in China
Dutch East India Company
Geopolitical rivalry
Naval history of China
Military history of the Ming dynasty
Wars involving the Dutch Republic
Wars involving the Ming dynasty
Wars involving Portugal